Olgierd is a Polish masculine given name.  Individuals with the name Olgierd include:
Olgierd Ciepły (1936–2007), Polish hammer thrower
Olgierd Darżynkiewicz (1923–2000), Polish sports shooter
Karol Olgierd Borchardt (1905–1986), Polish writer and captain of the Polish Merchant Marines
Olgierd Geblewicz (born 1972), Polish politician
Olgierd Łukaszewicz (born 1946), Polish film actor
Olgierd Moskalewicz (born 1974), Polish soccer player
Olgierd Porebski (1922–1995), Polish-born British fencer
Olgierd Stański (born 1973), Polish discus thrower
Olgierd Straszyński (1903–1971), Polish conductor
Olgierd Zienkiewicz (1921–2009), British academic, mathematician and civil engineer

References

Polish masculine given names